Sebastiania brevifolia is a species of flowering plant in the family Euphorbiaceae. It was originally described as Gymnanthes brevifolia Müll.Arg. in 1863. It is native to Bahia, Brazil.

References

Plants described in 1863
Flora of Brazil
brevifolia